Otso Diretso, initially called the Oposisyon Koalisyon was an electoral alliance formed to field candidates for the 2019 Philippine general election, in opposition to President Rodrigo Duterte. Otso Diretso fielded eight candidates (otso is the Filipino language literal translation of the Spanish word for "eight" or ocho) for the Senate election from the Liberal, Akbayan, Magdalo Party-List, and Aksyon Demokratiko parties. Senator Francis Pangilinan, president of the Liberal Party, served as the campaign manager.

None of the eight senatorial candidates under Otso Diretso won a seat. It was the first time in the history of the current bicameral composition of the Philippine Congress under the 1987 Constitution that the opposition failed to win a seat in one of the chambers, and the first time since the 1938 election that the opposition failed to win a single seat in a legislative election.

Background and platform 
The alliance believed that the 2019 midterm elections was a "referendum" on Duterte's government. The coalition aimed to build a new political culture based on political leaders practicing "makinig, matuto, kumilos" (Tagalog for "listen, learn, take action"), with each candidate emphasizing the need for government to listen to its citizens.

The coalition's platforms and policies were based on Project Makinig, a nationwide listening campaign conducted by 9,800 volunteers that generated 118,000 conversations. Project Makinig aimed to find out the issues most relevant to Filipino voters, to form the basis for the messaging, strategy, and platform of the coalition.

Otso Diretso's eight-point political platform included "poverty alleviation, a more robust economy with more jobs and lower prices of goods, a peaceful home and nation for the benefit of Filipino children, improved education and free college tuition that will lead to jobs, fair wages and profit for laborers, farmers, and fishermen, expanded rights for senior citizens and PWDs, national and judicial reform."

Robredo denounced the fielding of "popular" candidates into the senatorial slate for the purpose of ensuring victory and emphasized the inclusion of "relatively unknown" candidates, saying that "popularity should be at the lower end of the spectrum [of choosing candidates]."

Senatorial slate

Results 
All Otso Diretso candidates lost the election, the second time that a Liberal Party-led coalition suffered a great loss since 1955.

See also
Koalisyon ng Daang Matuwid
Team Robredo–Pangilinan

References

External links
 
 Project Makinig Official Website

2019 Philippine general election
Defunct political party alliances in the Philippines